Bharatamlo Arjunudu is a 1987 Telugu-language film directed by K. Raghavendra Rao and produced by K. S. Prakash Rao under the Prakash Studios banner. It stars Venkatesh and Khushbu, with music composed by Chakravarthy. The film was a remake of Hindi film Arjun. The film was as a flop at the box office.

Plot
Arjun is unemployed but tolerant and kind-hearted and stays with his father Dasaradharamayah, stepmother, and stepsister Kalyani. One day Arjun thrashes some ruffians who are thrashing a poor man for not paying extortion, headed by Ungarala Ramappa and Ungarala Kishtappa, protected by MLA Benerjee. With this incident, Arjun's life changes; he invokes the wrath of the local goon. Ugarala Kishtapa warns his parents and insults his sister, and the infuriated Arjun thrashes him and destroys all his activities. Arjun is arrested, and C.I. Keshava Rao's henchmen go to Benerjee let him off with a warning, but an Inspector Shekar notes that Arjun is doing the right thing, later he also begins to fall in love with Arjun's sister Kalyani. Arjun has also fallen in love with Sensational Subhadra, a journalist at his college meeting.

Soon, Arjun begins to grab public attention, MLA Benerjee also learns about Arjun and suspects that Arjun is working for his rival Ranganayakulu, a social reformer. Banerjee orders that Arjun and his friends be eliminated; The gang attacks and kills one of Arjun's friends Gokhale, who is killed in public. Though Arjun tries his best, no one comes forward to give witness to the murder out of fear, because of which the killers are let free. Soon Arjun's family put him out of the house, he is approached by Ranganayakulu, who invites him to his house and treats him as his son. With Arjun's help, Ranganayakulu destroys all the illegal activities of Benerjee, gets his sister Kalyani's marriage with Shekar at her request, and also handles the shop owner where his father is working, for ill-treating the latter. Finally, Ranganayakulu tells Arjun to get some secret files and documents against Benerjee, which can be used to expose him in public. Arjun gets that secret file at the risk of his life.

Now the story takes a twist; Arjun discovers that Ranganayakulu is a jackal who played the double game with him and has joined hands with Benerjee and that none of the evidence he collected has been published anywhere, as promised. Frustrated and angered, Arjun goes to fight the politicians at their speech rally but is simply thrown out. Finally, Arjun recollects all the evidence and presents it to the public and court, the criminals are arrested and the film ends with Arjun and Subhadra's marriage.

Cast

Venkatesh as Arjun
Khushbu as Sensational Subhadra
Rao Gopal Rao as M. L. A. Benerjee
Allu Ramalingaiyah as Subhadra's father
Nutan Prasad as C. I. Keshava Rao
Ranganath as Ranganayakulu
Kota Srinivasa Rao as Chenchuramayah
Sudhakar as Inspector Shekar
Paruchuri Brothers as Ungarala Ramappa and Ungarala Kishtappa
Chalapathi Rao as Mallesh
Sai Kumar as Gokhale
P. L. Narayana as Dasarathara
Chitti Babu as Bullet
Chidatala Appa Rao as Tea Stale Babai
Mada as Panganamala Ranganatham
Mucharalla Aruna as Jyothi
Samyuktha as Kalyani
Kuyaili as a Club Dancer
Tatineni Rajeswari as Arjun's stepmother
Kalpana Rai as Miss Swapna
Nirmalamma as Gokhale's Bamma

Soundtrack

Music composed by Chakravarthy. Lyrics written by Jonnavithhula Ramalingeswara Rao. Music released on Lahari Music.

References 

1987 films
1980s Telugu-language films
Films scored by K. Chakravarthy
Films directed by K. Raghavendra Rao
Telugu remakes of Hindi films